Lannea edulis is a small deciduous shrub that commonly occurs in East and Southern Africa, it belongs to the Anacardiaceae family.

Description 
It has leafy branches produced from underground rootstock (sub-shrub). Leaves are imparipinnately compound, about 2-4 pairs of leaflets per pinnae; leaf-blade is broadly ovate to oblong with a shiny and coriaceous surface, about 9-20 cm long and 9-12 cm wide. Flowers are small, yellowish to cream colored and are produced on spikes or panicles near the ground, normally appears before leaves. Fruit is a berry that turns scarlet-purple when ripe.

Distribution 
The species is endemic to parts of Angola, can also be found in East African countries like Tanzania and in Southern African.

Uses 
Root extracts are used in traditional medical practices by various communities; in Zambia it is used to treat problems associated with schistosomiasis, gonorrhea and diarrhea, in parts of South Africa, it is used to treat angina pectoris.

Fruit is edible and eaten by locals.

References 

Flora of East Tropical Africa
Flora of South Africa
edulis